Royal Air Force St Davids or more simply RAF St Davids is a former Royal Air Force station, near the city of St Davids, Wales, in the community of Solva.

History

The station was built in 1942/3 during the Second World War and was used by RAF Coastal Command.

Squadrons

Post war
After the Second World War the airfield was further used by Airwork Services Ltd until 1958 and the RAF Tactical Weapons Unit used one runway from 1974 - 1992 then parts of the airfield were finally sold off by the government in the mid-nineties. The area was the subject of an archaeological survey in 2000.

References

Citations

Bibliography

St Davids
St Davids
Defunct airports in Wales
St Davids